Tagalog is a Unicode block containing characters of the Baybayin script, specifically the variety used for writing the Tagalog language before Spanish colonization of the Philippines eventually led to the adoption of the Latin alphabet. It has been a part of the Unicode Standard since version 3.2 in April 2002. Tagalog characters can be found in the Noto Sans Tagalog font, among others. The Tagalog Baybayin script was originally proposed for inclusion in Unicode alongside its descendant Hanunoo, Buhid and Tagbanwa scripts as a single block called "Philippine Scripts" and two punctuation marks are only part of the Hanunoo block. In 2021, with version 14.0, the Unicode Standard was updated to add three new characters: the "ra" and archaic "ra", and the pamudpod.

History
The following Unicode-related documents record the purpose and process of defining specific characters in the Tagalog block:

Notes

References 

Unicode blocks